Franklin Township is one of nineteen townships in DeKalb County, Illinois, USA. As of the 2010 census, its population was 2,502 and it contained 950 housing units.

Geography

Cities, towns, villages
 Kirkland (mostly)

Unincorporated towns
 Fairdale at

Cemeteries

 Charter Oak
 Hick's Mill
 Maple
 Pine Hill

Airports and landing strips
 Harold Bunger Airport

Demographics

School districts
 Hiawatha Community Unit School District 426

Political districts
 Illinois's 16th congressional district
 State House District 69
 State House District 70
 State Senate District 35

References
 
 US Census Bureau 2009 TIGER/Line Shapefiles
 US National Atlas

External links
 City-Data.com
 Illinois State Archives
 Township Officials of Illinois
 DeKalb County Official Site

Townships in DeKalb County, Illinois
1849 establishments in Illinois
Townships in Illinois